Rupganj Union is a union parishad, the smallest administrative body of Bangladesh, located in Rupganj Upazila, Narayanganj District, Bangladesh. The total population is 44,013.

References

Unions of Rupganj Upazila